The Diocese of Wilmington is a Latin Church ecclesiastical territory, or diocese, of the Catholic Church in the eastern United States. The diocese comprises the entire state of Delaware and the Eastern Shore Region of Maryland.  The Diocese of Wilmington is one of three dioceses that spans two states or districts. 

On Thursday, April 30, 2021, Pope Francis accepted the resignation of Bishop William  Malooly and appointed William Koenig as his successor.

History

1800 to 1900 
Reverend Patrick Kenney established the first Catholic mission in Delaware in 1804 on the site of the Coffee Run Cemetery in Mill Creek. The Coffee Run Mission Site was listed on the National Register of Historic Places in 1973.

On March 3, 1868, Pope Pius IX erected the Diocese of Wilmington. The new diocese contained the following counties:

 All the counties in Delaware, taken from the Diocese of Philadelphia

 Caroline, Cecil, Dorchester, Kent, Queen Anne's, Somerset, Talbot, Wicomico, and Worcester counties in Maryland, taken from the Diocese of Philadelphia

 Accomack and Northampton counties in Virginia, taken from the Archdiocese of Baltimore.  

Pius IX designated the new diocese as a suffragan diocese of the Archdiocese of Baltimore.  He appointed Reverend Thomas Becker of the Archdiocese of Baltimore as the first bishop of Wilmington. Becker oversaw a three-fold increase in the number of priests and doubled the number of churches. He established an orphanage and academy for boys, an academy for girls, and two additional parochial schools.   After 18 years in Wilmington, Becker was appointed in 1886 by Pope Leo XIII as bishop of the Diocese of Savannah.

To replace Becker, Leo XIII in 1886 appointed Reverend Alfred Curtis from the Archdiocese of Baltimore as the second bishop of Wilmington. During his tenure as bishop, Curtis  introduced the Josephite Fathers into the diocese to minister to African American Catholics.  Curtis also built St. Joseph Church in Wilmington, an orphanage, and a parochial school and segregated facilities for the African-American congregation. He also erected a cloistered convent for the Visitation Nuns.  Twice a year, Curtis would visit the county almshouse to minister to the poor and bring them food. When he took office, Curtis discovered that all the church property in the diocese was under the personal name of the bishop.  He spent the next few years filing legal transfers of all the property to the diocese itself.  He also led efforts to clear the sizable debt held by the diocese and its parishes.

1900 to 1960 
Curtis retired in 1896 due to poor health and Leo XIII appointed Reverend John  Monaghan of the Diocese of Charleston as his replacement.  When Monaghan became bishop, the diocese had 25,000 Catholics, thirty priests, twenty-two churches and eighteen missions, twelve seminarians, eight religious communities, three academies, nine parochial schools, and three orphanages. During his tenure, Monaghan established seven parishes, seven missions, and eight schools. He also was instrumental in the establishment of the Oblate Fathers' Salesianum School for boys in Wilmington, St. Francis Hospital in Wilmington, and a home for the elderly.Monaghan retired in 1925 and Pope Pius XI replaced him with Reverend Edmond Fitzmaurice from the Archdiocese of Philadelphia.

During his 35-year tenure, Fitzmaurice oversaw an increase in the Catholic population from 34,000 to 85,000. To accommodate these numbers, he founded 17 new parishes, eight missions, and 19 elementary and nine secondary schools. Fitzmaurice encouraged participation in Catholic Charities, and founded the Catholic Welfare Guild, Catholic Youth Organization, Society for the Propagation of the Faith, and Knights of Columbus chapter in the diocese.  He also established the Catholic Interracial Council, the Catholic Forum of the Air,  the Catholic Television Guild, the Diocesan Book Forum, the Catholic Education Guild, and the Young Christian Workers. 

In 1945, Fitzmaurice ordered the Catholic parents of students in public high schools in the diocese to prohibit their children from attending sex education courses, which he described as "offensive to the Catholic conscience."  Pope Pius XII in 1958 appointed Reverend Michael Hyle of the Archdiocese of Baltimore as coadjutor bishop in Wilmington to assist the bishop. Fitzmaurice donated his personal residence in 1959 to provide a location for the founding of St. Edmond's Academy in Wilmington, which was named in his honor.

1960 to present 
When Fitzmaurice resigned in 1960 as bishop of the Diocese of Wilmington, Hyle automatically succeeded him.  He dedicated much of his administration to the implementation of the Second Vatican Council reforms, encouraging the formation of parish councils and the ecumenical movement. Hyle also established St. Mark's High School in Wilmington and the University of Delaware's Newman Centre (Thomas More Oratory) in Newark, Delaware. Hyle died in 1967 and Pope Paul VI appointed Auxiliary Bishop Thomas Mardaga from the Archdiocese of Baltimore as the next bishop of Wilmington.

During his 16-year tenure, Mardaga continued the implementation of the Second Vatican Council reformes, establishing a council for the laity and participating in ecumenical work. He also reorganized the diocesan curia and created a ministry for migrant workers.On May 22 1974, Paul VI transferred the two Virginia counties in the Diocese of Wilmington to the Diocese of Richmond, establishing the present territory of the diocese.  Following Mardaga's death in 1984, Pope John Paul II in 1985 named Auxiliary Bishop Robert Mulvee from the Diocese of Manchester as Mardaga's replacement.

During his tenure as bishop of Wilmington, Mulvee emphasized collegiality in his administration of the diocese, helped restructure the Delmarva Ecumenical Agency into the Christian Council of Delaware and Maryland's Eastern Shore, and founded three new missions and raised a fourth to parish status.Mulvee's tenure in Wilmington ended in 1995 when John Paul II named him as coadjutor bishop for the Diocese of Providence.

John Paul II named Auxiliary Bishop Michael Saltarelli of the Archdiocese of Newark as Mulvee's replacement in Wilmington in 1996. During his tenure, Saltarelli oversaw an increase of over 60,000 Catholics in the diocese, ordained 23 priests and 47 permanent deacons, and constructed or renovated numerous churches, schools, and other facilities.  After Saltarelli retired in 2007, Pope Benedict XVI named Auxiliary Bishop W. Francis Malooly of the Archdiocese of Baltimore to replace him. Malooly was criticized by some Catholic news outlets for refusing to withhold communion from then Vice President Joseph Biden due to his position on abortion rights for women.

Sexual abuse cases
In 2009, the Diocese of Wilmington filed for Chapter 11 bankruptcy in the face of financial liabilities from lawsuits regarding sexual abuse by priests.  In 2011, 150 victims received an average of $310,000 each, totaling $77.425 million. Defendants in the cases were not identified.

In 2017, Netflix released the documentary series The Keepers,  an investigation into the 1969 murder of Sister Catherine Cesnik in Baltimore.  According to the documentary Bishop Malooly in 1994 met with Charles Franz and his mother Denise Franz to discuss their allegations of sexual abuse by Joseph Maskell, a diocese priest, against Charles Franz when he was a minor.  In that meeting, Denise Franz said that she had reported Maskell to the archdiocese in 1967.  The documentary claims that Malooly falsely denied that claim during the meeting.  In an official response, Malooly said he told the Franzes that the archdiocese had no record of that 1967 report on Maskell.

The Keepers also charged that the archdiocese, aware of accusations against Maskell, still allowed him to work at Seton Keough Catholic school from 1968 to 1975, where he abused several dozen children   In his statement, Malooly said that he first heard allegations against Maskell in 1992, when Malooly was chancellor of the archdiocese.  At that time, the archdiocese removed Maskell from ministry, sent him for treatment and started an investigation.  He returned to ministry in 1993 after the archdiocese failed to substantiate the charges against him

Malooly retired in 2021 and Pope Francis appointed Monsignor William Koenig of the Diocese of Rockville Centre as the new bishop of Wilmington. Koenig is the current bishop of the Diocese of Wilmington.

Bishops

Bishops of Wilmington
 Thomas Albert Andrew Becker (1868–1886), appointed Bishop of Savannah
 Alfred Allen Paul Curtis (1886–1896)
 John James Joseph Monaghan (1897–1925)
 Edmond John Fitzmaurice (1925–1960), appointed Archbishop ad personam upon retirement in 1960  - Hubert James Cartwright (coadjutor bishop 1956–1958); died before succession
 Michael William Hyle (1960–1967; coadjutor bishop 1958–1960)
 Thomas Joseph Mardaga (1968–1984)
 Robert Edward Mulvee (1985–1995), appointed Coadjutor Bishop of Providence and later succeeded to that see
 Michael Angelo Saltarelli (1995–2008)
 William Francis Malooly (2008–2021)
 William Edward Koenig (2021-present)

Other priests of the diocese who became bishops
 Benjamin Joseph Keiley (priest here 1873–1886), appointed Bishop of Savannah in 1900
 James C. Burke, O.P., was Territorial Prelate of Chimbote (1965-1978, being consecrated bishop in 1967) before serving here 1978-1994
 John Barres, appointed Bishop of Allentown in 2009 and later Bishop of Rockville Centre

Churches

High schools
 Padua Academy, Wilmington, DE
 Saints Peter and Paul High School, Easton, MD
 St. Elizabeth High School, Wilmington, DE
 St. Mark's High School, Wilmington, DE

Closed schools
 St. Thomas More Preparatory, Magnolia, DE

See also

 Historical list of the Catholic bishops of the United States
 List of the Catholic dioceses of the United States
 List of Roman Catholic archdioceses (by country and continent)
 List of Roman Catholic dioceses (alphabetical) (including archdioceses)
 List of Roman Catholic dioceses (structured view) (including archdioceses)
 St. Anthony's Roman Catholic Church (Wilmington, Delaware)
 St. Catherine of Siena Parish, Wilmington, Delaware
 Serviam Girls Academy

References
Notes

Citations

External links

Roman Catholic Diocese of Wilmington Official Site
Catholic Hierarchy Profile of the Diocese of Wilmington 
The Dialog newspaper published by The Diocese

 
Wilmington
Wilmington
Catholic Church in Delaware
Catholic Church in Maryland
Religious organizations established in 1868
Wilmington
1868 establishments in Delaware
Companies that filed for Chapter 11 bankruptcy in 2009